The Waits Mansion is an historic two-story Mediterranean Revival style house in Bonifay, Florida. The mansion was built by lumber company owner George Orkney Waits in the 1920s for his own use.

Location
The Waits Mansion features recessed porches on each of the front floors with fluted Doric columns on the first floor porch. White wrought iron fencing is used on both porches as well as along the two bordering streets.

Description
The interior of the Mansion features a grand staircase from the large entrance foyer to a windowed landing with smaller stairways on the left and right leading to the second floor. In recent years, the mansion was used as a bed and breakfast.

History
In 1919, George Orkney Waits purchased the land for the Waits Mansion from M.E. and Meridien Johnson. The architect was a Mr. Ausfeldt and the contractor was William Whaley. George Waits and his wife lived in the mansion for a short time, then moved out of state.

In 1936, James C. Waits, the oldest Waits son, and his wife bought the Waits Mansion from the Henderson Waits Lumber Company. They restored it and planted azaleas, camellias and other shrubs . 

Prior to James Wait's death in 1948, the Waits Manions was converted into apartments. It was later sold to Mr. and Mrs. Robert Hall, two of the tenants.  In 1976. Dorothy Garver bought the mansion and restored it to a one-family residence. 

The next owner was Frank Barone, who operated the Waits Mansion as lodging and party venue. The most recent owner was Don Smith, who started more restoration work.

References

Much of the information in this is from the article was from Sonny for the HERITAGE OF HOLMES COUNTY which was published in 2002.

Buildings and structures in Holmes County, Florida
Residential buildings completed in the 20th century
Mediterranean Revival architecture in Florida